Lofthouse may refer to:

Locations
 Lofthouse, North Yorkshire
 Lofthouse, West Yorkshire
 Lofthouse, a former name of Loftus, North Yorkshire
 Lofthouse and Outwood railway station

People
 Alan Lofthouse, South African bowler
 Andrew Lofthouse, Australian news presenter
 Geoffrey Lofthouse, Baron Lofthouse of Pontefract (1925–2012), British politician
 James Lofthouse (footballer, born 1894) (born 1894), British footballer
 Joe Lofthouse (1865–1919), English footballer
 Joseph Lofthouse, Jr. (1880–1962), Canadian bishop
 Joseph Lofthouse, Sr. (1855–1933), Canadian bishop
 Joy Lofthouse (1923-2017), British WW2 pilot
 Mark Lofthouse (born 1957), Canadian ice hockey player
 Nat Lofthouse (1925–2011), British footballer

Other
 Lofthouse Colliery disaster
Lofthouse of Fleetwood, a British company which manufactures Fisherman's Friend lozenges